The list of ship launches in 2017 includes a chronological list of ships launched in 2017.


See also

References

2017
Ship launches
 
Ship launches